The Klingon Gambit is a science fiction novel by American writer Robert E. Vardeman, part of the Star Trek: The Original Series franchise.

Synopsis
The Klingon ship Terror has recently murdered the innocent crew of a Vulcan science ship. The Enterprise is sent to meet this new threat, only to fall apart from within. Crew members throw immature temper tantrums. Orders are ignored. One by one, the crew are losing their minds.

External links

Novels based on Star Trek: The Original Series
1981 American novels
American science fiction novels